Christ Episcopal Church is an Episcopal Church in Chattanooga, Tennessee founded by Prof. John Roy Baylor in 1900.

References

https://www.tn.gov/content/dam/tn/historicalcommission/national-register-general/thc_national-reg_draftsjanuary2021/TN_Hamilton%20County_Christ%20Church%20Episcopal_Watermarked.pdf
https://christchurchchattanooga.org/about/our-history/

National Register of Historic Places in Chattanooga, Tennessee
Commercial buildings on the National Register of Historic Places in Tennessee
Commercial buildings completed in 1906
Churches in Chattanooga, Tennessee